Munir Itani was a Lebanese alpine skier. He competed in the men's combined at the 1948 Winter Olympics.

References

External links
 

Year of birth missing
Possibly living people
Lebanese male alpine skiers
Olympic alpine skiers of Lebanon
Alpine skiers at the 1948 Winter Olympics
Place of birth missing